Viničné Šumice is a municipality and village in Brno-Country District in the South Moravian Region of the Czech Republic. It has about 1,400 inhabitants.

Geography
It lies on the border between the Vyškov Gate and the Drahany Highlands.

History
The first written mention of Šumice is from 1350. In 1925 the name of the municipality was changed to Viničné Šumice (from vinice, meaning "vineyard").

Economy
Viničné Šumice is the northernmost wine municipality in Moravia.

References

Villages in Brno-Country District